The 2014 IFSC Climbing World Championships, the 13th edition, were held in Munich, Germany from 21 to 23 August 2014 for bouldering and in Gijón, Spain from 8 to 14 September 2014 for lead, speed, and paraclimbing.

Danyil Boldyrev set a new world record of 5.60s in the speed final against Stanislav Kokorin.

Medal winners overview

Bouldering

Women 
80 athletes attended the women's bouldering competition.

Men 
112 athletes attended the men's bouldering competition.

Lead

Women 
49 athletes attended the women's lead competition.

Men 
74 athletes attended the men's lead competition.

Speed

Women 
35 athletes competed in the women's speed climbing event.

Men 
38 athletes competed in the men's speed climbing event.

Combined 
Only climbers who competed in all three disciplines (Lead, Speed, and Boulder) of both IFSC World Championships Munich 2014 and IFSC World Championships Gijón 2014 were included in the Combined ranking.

Women

Men

References 

IFSC Climbing World Championships
World Climbing Championships
International sports competitions hosted by Germany
International sports competitions hosted by Spain